Through The Never can refer to:

 Metallica: Through the Never, a 2013 Metallica concert film
 Metallica: Through the Never (album), the soundtrack album for the film
 "Through the Never", the seventh track on the 1991 Metallica album, Metallica